Madeleine Ferron (July 24, 1922 – February 27, 2010) was a Canadian writer.

Biography
She was born in Louiseville, Quebec. She began her early studies with the Sisters of Saint Anne, continuing at the Université de Montréal and Université Laval.  She married Robert Cliche, a lawyer, in 1945.

A writer and novelist, she also worked as a government commissioner and radio show host.  She wrote for several magazines, notably Châtelaine and L'actualité. Ferron tried to analyse lucidly the often obscure emotions of her literary characters.  She was the sister of writer Jacques Ferron and painter and stained glass artist Marcelle Ferron. She died in February 2010 in Quebec City, Quebec.

Her son David Cliche served in the National Assembly of Quebec as a Parti Québécois MNA.

Awards and honours
 1992 - Knight of the National Order of Quebec
 Prix des Éditions La Presse
 Prix France-Québec
 Prix littéraire de la ville de Montréal

Publications
 La Fin des loups-garous, 1966
 Cœur de sucre, 1966
 Le baron écarlate, 1971
 Quand le peuple fait la loi, 1972
 Les beaucerons, ces insoumis, 1735-1867 : petite histoire de la Beauce, 1974
 Le chemin des dames, 1977
 Histoires édifiantes, 1981
 Sur le chemin Craig, 1983
 Un Singulier amour, 1987
 Le Grand théâtre, 1989
 Adrienne, 1993
 La Tricheuse 1977

External links
 Madeleine Ferron entry in the Dictionary of Literary Biography
 Madeleine Ferron's obituary 

1922 births
2010 deaths
Canadian women novelists
Writers from Quebec
People from Louiseville
People from Beauce, Quebec
Spouses of Canadian politicians
Université de Montréal alumni
Université Laval alumni
Knights of the National Order of Quebec
20th-century Canadian novelists
20th-century Canadian women writers
Canadian novelists in French